The anchoring effect is a cognitive bias whereby an individual's decisions are influenced by a particular reference point or 'anchor'. Both numeric and non-numeric anchoring have been reported in research. In numeric anchoring, once the value of the anchor is set, subsequent arguments, estimates, etc. made by an individual may change from what they would have otherwise been without the anchor. For example, an individual may be more likely to purchase a car if it is placed alongside a more expensive model (the anchor). Prices discussed in negotiations that are lower than the anchor may seem reasonable, perhaps even cheap to the buyer, even if said prices are still relatively higher than the actual market value of the car.  Another example may be when estimating the orbit of Mars, one might start with the Earth's orbit (365 days) and then adjust upward until they reach a value that seems reasonable (usually less than 687 days, the correct answer).

The original description of the anchoring effect came from psychophysics. When judging stimuli along a continuum, it was noticed that the first and last stimuli were used to compare the other stimuli (this is also referred to as "end anchoring"). This was applied to attitudes by Sherif et al. in their 1958 article "Assimilation and effects of anchoring stimuli on judgments".

Experimental findings

The anchoring and adjustment heuristic was first theorized by Amos Tversky and Daniel Kahneman. Because participants did not have enough time to calculate the full answer, they had to make an estimate after their first few multiplications. When these first multiplications gave a small answer – because the sequence started with small numbers – the median estimate was 512; when the sequence started with the larger numbers, the median estimate was 2,250. (The correct answer is 40,320.) In another study by Tversky and Kahneman, participants were asked to estimate the percentage of African countries in the United Nations. Before estimating, the participants first observed a roulette wheel that was predetermined to stop on either 10 or 65. Participants whose wheel stopped on 10 guessed lower values (25% on average) than participants whose wheel stopped at 65 (45% on average). The pattern has held in other experiments for a wide variety of different subjects of estimation.

As a second example, in a study by Dan Ariely, an audience is first asked to write the last two digits of their social security number and consider whether they would pay this number of dollars for items whose value they did not know, such as wine, chocolate and computer equipment. They were then asked to bid for these items, with the result that the audience members with higher two-digit numbers would submit bids that were between 60 percent and 120 percent higher than those with the lower social security numbers, which had become their anchor. When asked if they believed the number was informative of the value of the item, quite a few said yes. Trying to avoid this confusion, a small number of studies used procedures that were clearly random, such as Excel random generator button and die roll, and failed to replicate anchoring effects.

The anchoring effect was also found to be present in a study in the Journal of Real Estate Research in relation to house prices. In this investigation, it was established that the 2-year and 9-year highs on the Case-Shiller House Price Index could be used as anchors in predicting current house prices. The findings were used to indicate that, in forecasting house prices, these 2-year and 9-years highs might be relevant.

Difficulty of avoiding
Various studies have shown that anchoring is very difficult to avoid. For example, in one study students were given anchors that were wrong. They were asked whether Mahatma Gandhi died before or after age 9, or before or after age 140. Clearly neither of these anchors can be correct, but when the two groups were asked to suggest when they thought he had died, they guessed significantly differently (average age of 50 vs. average age of 67).

Other studies have tried to eliminate anchoring much more directly. In a study exploring the causes and properties of anchoring, participants were exposed to an anchor and asked to guess how many physicians were listed in the local phone book. In addition, they were explicitly informed that anchoring would "contaminate" their responses, and that they should do their best to correct for that. A control group received no anchor and no explanation. Regardless of how they were informed and whether they were informed correctly, all of the experimental groups reported higher estimates than the control group. Thus, despite being expressly aware of the anchoring effect, participants were still unable to avoid it. A later study found that even when offered monetary incentives, people are unable to effectively adjust from an anchor.

Durability of anchoring
Anchoring effects are also shown to remain adequately present given the accessibility of knowledge pertaining to the target. This, in turn, suggests that despite a delay in judgement towards a target, the extent of anchoring effects have seen to remain unmitigated within a given time period. A series of three experiments were conducted to test the longevity of anchoring effects. It was observed that despite a delay of one week being introduced for half the sample population of each experiment, similar results of immediate judgement and delayed judgement of the target were achieved.  The experiments concluded that external information experienced within the delayed judgement period shows little influence relative to self-generated anchors even with commonly encountered targets (temperature) used in one of the experiments, showing that anchoring effects may precede priming in duration especially when the anchoring effects were formed during the task. Further research to conclude an effect that is effectively retained over a substantial period of time has proven inconsistent.

Anchoring bias in groups

Given the old saying that 'Two Heads are Better than One', it is often presumed that groups come to a more unbiased decision relative to individuals. However, this assumption is supported with varied findings that could not come to a general consensus. Nevertheless, while some groups are able to perform better than an individual member, they are found to be just as biased or even more biased relative to their individual counterparts. A possible cause would be the discriminatory fashion in which information is communicated, processed and aggregated based on each individual's anchored knowledge and belief. This results in a diminished quality in the decision-making process and consequently, amplifies the pre-existing anchored biases.

The cause of group anchoring remains obscure. Group anchors may have been established at the group level or may simply be the culmination of several individual's personal anchors. Previous studies have shown that when given an anchor before the experiment, individual members consolidated the respective anchors to attain a decision in the direction of the anchor placed. However, a distinction between individual and group-based anchor biases does exist, with groups tending to ignore or disregard external information due to the confidence in the joint decision-making process. The presence of pre-anchor preferences also impeded the extent to which external anchors affected the group decision, as groups tend to allocate more weight to self-generated anchors, according to the 'competing anchor hypothesis'.

A series of experiments were conducted to investigate anchoring bias in groups and possible solutions to avoid or mitigate anchoring. The first experiment established that groups are indeed influenced by anchors while the other two experiments highlighted methods to overcome group anchoring bias. Utilized methods include the use of process accountability and motivation through competition instead of cooperation to reduce the influence of anchors within groups.

Business intelligence 
A peer-reviewed study sought to investigate the effect of business intelligence (BI) systems on the anchoring effect. Business intelligence denotes an array of software and services used by businesses to gather valuable insights into an organisation's performance. The extent to which cognitive bias is mitigated by using these systems was the overarching question in this study. While the independent variable was the use of the BI system, the dependent variable was the outcome of the decision-making process. The subjects were presented with a 'plausible' anchor and a 'spurious' anchor in a forecasting decision. It was found that, while the BI system mitigated the negative effects of the spurious anchor, it had no influence on the effects of the plausible anchor. This is important in a business context, because it shows that humans are still susceptible to cognitive biases, even when using sophisticated technological systems. One of the subsequent recommendations from the experimenters was to implement a forewarning into BI systems as to the anchoring effect.

Causes
Several theories have been put forth to explain what causes anchoring, and although some explanations are more popular than others, there is no consensus as to which is best. In a study on possible causes of anchoring, two authors described anchoring as easy to demonstrate, but hard to explain. At least one group of researchers has argued that multiple causes are at play, and that what is called "anchoring" is actually several different effects.

Anchoring-and-adjusting
In their original study, Tversky and Kahneman put forth a view later termed anchoring-as-adjustment. According to this theory, once an anchor is set, people adjust away from it to get to their final answer; however, they adjust insufficiently, resulting in their final guess being closer to the anchor than it would be otherwise. Other researchers also found evidence supporting the anchoring-and-adjusting explanation. Factors that influence the capacity for judgmental correction, like alcohol intoxication and performing a taxing cognitive load (rehearsing a long string of digits in working memory) tend to increase anchoring effects. If people know the direction in which they should adjust, incentivizing accuracy also appears to reduce anchoring effects.

This model is not without its critiques. Proponents of alternative theories have criticized this model, claiming it is only applicable when the initial anchor is outside the range of acceptable answers. To use an earlier example, since Mahatma Gandhi obviously did not die at age 9, then people will adjust from there. If a reasonable number were given, though, there would be no adjustment. Therefore, this theory cannot, according to its critics, explain all cases of anchoring effect.

Selective accessibility
An alternate explanation regarding selective accessibility  is derived from a theory called "confirmatory hypothesis testing". In short, selective accessibility proposes that when given an anchor, a judge (i.e. a person making some judgment) will evaluate the hypothesis that the anchor is a suitable answer. Assuming it is not, the judge moves on to another guess, but not before accessing all the relevant attributes of the anchor itself. Then, when evaluating the new answer, the judge looks for ways in which it is similar to the anchor, resulting in the anchoring effect. Various studies have found empirical support for this hypothesis. This explanation assumes that the judge considers the anchor to be a plausible value so that it is not immediately rejected, which would preclude considering its relevant attributes. For example, an online-experiment showed that ratings of previous members of the crowd could act as an anchor. When displaying the results of previous ratings in the context of business model idea evaluation, people incorporate the displayed anchor into their own decision-making process, leading to a decreasing variance of ratings.

Attitude change
More recently, a third explanation of anchoring has been proposed concerning attitude change. According to this theory, providing an anchor changes someone's attitudes to be more favorable to the particular attributes of that anchor, biasing future answers to have similar characteristics as the anchor. Leading proponents of this theory consider it to be an alternate explanation in line with prior research on anchoring-and-adjusting and selective accessibility.

Influencing factors

Mood
A wide range of research has linked sad or depressed moods with more extensive and accurate evaluation of problems. As a result of this, earlier studies hypothesized that people with more depressed moods would tend to use anchoring less than those with happier moods. However, more recent studies have shown the opposite effect: sad people are more likely to use anchoring than people with happy or neutral mood. In a study focusing on medical practitioners, it was found that physicians that possess positive moods are less susceptible to anchoring bias, when compared to physicians with neutral moods. This was specifically found to be because a positive mood leads to information processing that is more systematic which leads to more efficient problem solving. This leads to a decreased anchoring effect.

Experience
Early research found that experts (those with high knowledge, experience, or expertise in some field) were more resistant to the anchoring effect. However, anchoring happens unconsciously which means that unless someone who is knowledgeable is warned prior, they are still susceptible to anchoring. Since then, however, numerous studies have demonstrated that while experience can sometimes reduce the effect, even experts are susceptible to anchoring. In a study concerning the effects of anchoring on judicial decisions, researchers found that even experienced legal professionals were affected by anchoring. This remained true even when the anchors provided were arbitrary and unrelated to the case in question. Also, this relates to goal setting, where more experienced individuals will set goals based on their past experiences which consequently affects end results in negotiations.

Expertise is when a judge has relevant knowledge. In a study using price estimation of cars, it was found that relevant knowledge positively influenced anchoring. Expertise in cognitive bias is related to experience however the two are not exclusively exhaustive. In a study using stock return estimates, it was found that expertise decreases behavioural bias significantly. It was found that other factors like cognitive ability and experience where there is no susceptibility to anchoring or a susceptibility as it increases, tend to become factors that decrease the effects of anchoring when they are an expert.

Personality
Research has correlated susceptibility to anchoring with most of the Big Five personality traits. The personality traits are as follows. Conscientiousness, a character that is orderly and responsible. Neuroticism, an individual that has an uneasy nature and is unstable. Extraversion which is where a person is sociable and outgoing in nature. Openness to experience which is an intelligent and creative personality trait. Agreeableness, where someone is polite and trusting. People high in agreeableness and conscientiousness and neuroticism are more likely to be affected by anchoring, while those high in extraversion and openness to experience are less likely to be affected. Another study found that those high in openness to new experiences were more susceptible to the anchoring effect.

Cognitive ability
The impact of cognitive ability on anchoring is contested. A recent study on willingness to pay for consumer goods found that anchoring decreased in those with greater cognitive ability, though it did not disappear. Another study, however, found that cognitive ability had no significant effect on how likely people were to use anchoring. In a poker-like experiment that included people of differing academic achievement and psychometric reasoning scoring, it has been found that anchoring is not related to education level. It also found that numerical reasoning and reflection scores had a negative association with anchoring susceptibility.

Overconfidence

Although overconfidence emanates from the heuristic and refers more specifically to a behavioural tendency to take their initial assessment and put more emphasis on it during making their initial assessment leading to cognitive conceit. Cognitive conceit or overconfidence arises from other factors like personal cognitive attributes such as knowledge and decision-making ability, decreasing the probability to pursue external sources of confirmation. This factor has also been shown to arise with tasks with greater difficulty. Even within subject matter experts, they were also prey to such behaviour of overconfidence and should more so, actively reduce such behaviour. Following the study of estimations under uncertain, despite several attempts to curb overconfidence proving unsuccessful, Tversky and Kahneman (1971) suggest an effective solution to overconfidence is for subjects to explicitly establish anchors to help reduce overconfidence in their estimates.

Anchoring in negotiations
In the negotiation process anchoring serves to determine an accepted starting point for the subsequent negotiations. As soon as one side states their first price offer, the (subjective) anchor is set. The counterbid (counter-anchor) is the second-anchor.

In addition to the initial research conducted by Tversky and Kahneman, multiple other studies have shown that anchoring can greatly influence the estimated value of an object. For instance, although negotiators can generally appraise an offer based on multiple characteristics, studies have shown that they tend to focus on only one aspect. In this way, a deliberate starting point can strongly affect the range of possible counteroffers. The process of offer and counteroffer results in a mutually beneficial arrangement. However, multiple studies have shown that initial offers have a stronger influence on the outcome of negotiations than subsequent counteroffers.

An example of the power of anchoring has been conducted during the Strategic Negotiation Process Workshops. During the workshop, a group of participants is divided into two sections: buyers and sellers. Each side receives identical information about the other party before going into a one-on-one negotiation. Following this exercise, both sides debrief about their experiences. The results show that where the participants anchor the negotiation had a significant effect on their success.

Anchoring affects everyone, even people who are highly knowledgeable in a field. Northcraft and Neale conducted a study to measure the difference in the estimated value of a house between students and real-estate agents. In this experiment, both groups were shown a house and then given different listing prices. After making their offer, each group was then asked to discuss what factors influenced their decisions. In the follow-up interviews, the real-estate agents denied being influenced by the initial price, but the results showed that both groups were equally influenced by that anchor.

Anchoring can have more subtle effects on negotiations as well. Janiszewski and Uy investigated the effects of precision of an anchor. Participants read an initial price for a beach house, then gave the price they thought it was worth. They received either a general, seemingly nonspecific anchor (e.g., $800,000) or a more precise and specific anchor (e.g., $799,800). Participants with a general anchor adjusted their estimate more than those given a precise anchor ($751,867 vs $784,671). The authors propose that this effect comes from difference in scale; in other words, the anchor affects not only the starting value, but also the starting scale. When given a general anchor of $20, people will adjust in large increments ($19, $21, etc.), but when given a more specific anchor like $19.85, people will adjust on a lower scale ($19.75, $19.95, etc.). Thus, a more specific initial price will tend to result in a final price closer to the initial one.

As for the question of setting the first or second anchor, the party setting the second anchor has the advantage in that the counter-anchor determines the point midway between both anchors. Due to a possible lack of knowledge the party setting the first anchor can also set it too low, i.e. against their own interests. Generally negotiators who set the first anchor also tend to be less satisfied with the negotiation outcome, than negotiators who set the counter-anchor. This may be due to the regret or sense that they did not achieve or rather maximise the full potential of the negotiations. However, studies suggest that negotiators who set the first offer frequently achieve economically more advantageous results.

See also

 List of cognitive biases
 Poisoning the well
 Primacy effect
 Negotiation strategies
 Law of the instrument

References

Further reading
 

Behavioral economics
Cognitive biases
Heuristics
Prospect theory